Patrick Watson Tompkins (1804May 8, 1853) was an American lawyer and politician who served one term as a U.S. Representative from Mississippi from 1847 to 1849.

Biography 
Born in Kentucky in 1804, Tompkins received a limited education. He studied law, and was admitted to the bar and commenced practice in Vicksburg, Mississippi.  He served as judge of the circuit court.

Congress 
Tompkins was elected as a Whig to the Thirtieth Congress (March 4, 1847 – March 3, 1849).  He served as chairman of the Committee on Expenditures in the Department of the Navy (Thirtieth Congress).

Later career and death 
He moved to California during the gold rush of 1849, and died in San Francisco, California, May 8, 1853. He was interred in Yerba Buena Cemetery, and later moved around 1870 to Golden Gate Cemetery.

References

1853 deaths
Members of the United States House of Representatives from Mississippi
1804 births
Mississippi Whigs
Whig Party members of the United States House of Representatives
19th-century American politicians
Mississippi state court judges
19th-century American judges